English alternative pop band the 1975 has released five studio albums, a live album, five extended plays, 35 music videos and 34 singles.
The band's debut album, The 1975 (2013), debuted at number one on the UK Albums Chart and was certified Platinum by the British Phonographic Industry. Its follow-up, I Like It When You Sleep, for You Are So Beautiful yet So Unaware of It, was released on 26 February 2016 and became their second successive chart topper.

Subsequent albums A Brief Inquiry into Online Relationships (2018) and Notes on a Conditional Form (2020) both reached number one as well. The band's fifth album Being Funny in a Foreign Language followed on 14 October 2022.

Albums

Studio albums

Live albums

Extended plays

Singles

As lead artist

As featured artist

Remixes

Other charted songs

Music videos

Production credits

Notes

References

Discography
Discographies of British artists